The Atlanta Conference of Negro Problems was an annual conference held at Atlanta University, organized by W. E. B. Du Bois, and held every year from 1896 to 1914.

Purpose of the Conference
The purpose of the Atlanta Conference of Negro Problems was to outline the many difficulties that the black community faced, to suggest solutions to these problems, and to publicize grievances with modern social protocols. This organization attempted to come up with solutions for the then-current problems facing the black community.

At Atlanta University, in 1897, resided both African Americans and whites; though many universities were similar in that respect, Atlanta University was unique in that black students and white faculty used the same dormitories and dining hall, and the smaller number of white students used the same space as well. The state of Georgia gave no funding to the school, because many of the Georgia state lawmakers actively resisted educational opportunities for black citizens. In fact, Atlanta University, as well as other private schools in the city, were the only options for black high school education, although multiple white public high schools existed in the city.

W. E. B. Du Bois came to Atlanta University as a professor. Many people believed that he was not religious enough (or did not practice the right religion) to teach at the university. Du Bois promised that he would use the Episcopal prayer book whenever he needed to fulfill his student chapel duties, so he was permitted to work there. Du Bois, as a member of the African American community, recognized and deeply cared about the threats that were posed against them. He decided to hold the Atlanta Conference of Negro Problems to discuss various solutions to these problems, whilst contributing to the formation of a more equal society.

There were several graduates of Atlanta University who told various faculty and trustee members of the school information that made them aware of the need for a thorough investigation into the conditions of living in the Negro populations of cities. As a result, Bumstead and Bradford proposed annual investigations of the social, economic, and physical condition of Black Americans. The "investigation" would be developed into a department called the Atlanta Sociological Laboratory. It was quickly approved by the Atlanta University Board of Trustees, and a conference was set to take place later in the year, during the Atlanta Exposition, guided by Bradford. Later discussion caused the conference to be rescheduled for the spring of 1896.

About the Conference

The first two Atlanta University Conferences of Negro Problems were held by George C. Bradford, in 1896 and 1897. Even though he co-founded the Atlanta University Studies and directed these first two conferences, Bradford's contributions to these events have still not been fully investigated. It is often W. E. B. DuBois who gets the credit for the founding of the annual conference.

The first Conference of Negro Problems at Atlanta University focused on the morality of African Americans in cities. Bradford invited the Department of Labour to help him carry out the study, to tabulate and publish the results. The statistics they collected became the basis of a serious dealing with the social and economic conditions of African Americans.

Du Bois thought that the biggest problem with the early Atlanta University Studies was Bradford's efforts to replicate the Hampton and Tuskegee models. He was determined to execute at Atlanta University what he had previously been unable to get administrators and white institutions to try. This was a program of objective and scientific inquiry into social, economic, and political conditions of African Americans. Another notable problem that the Atlanta University Studies encountered was Bradford's lack of social science background, especially dealing with racial problems. Bradford was a Boston businessman who graduated from Harvard in finance, so was not experienced enough to perfect his studies of black Americans and Atlanta University. The president of Atlanta University, Horace Bumstead, eventually searched for a more qualified figure to lead the research program at the university.

Consequences of the Conference

One of the most significant results of the studies of the conference included increased state and national aid for African American high schools, resulting from the 1901 study. This study uncovered that the money allocated to maintaining and running Black schools was less than the money allotted to similar White schools. For instance, Delaware, in 1896, gave $1.66 per capita for White students, and $0.81 for Black students. As well, it was uncovered that African Americans were responsible for providing most of the funds to support their schools. There was even an unequal distribution of money for salaries; white teachers earned significantly more than black teachers at the time. Though this may be in part due to differences in education levels achieved, racism still could have been a cause of this as many teachers were required to have the same basic skills. Many Southern states reported, during this study, that the cost of running schools for blacks was entirely supported by donations from African Americans. Upon learning about this, Du Bois called for increased state and national support of these Negro schools.

Change was not immediate, however. Du Bois reinvestigated high school education amidst African Americans a decade later, and found that little change had actually occurred. For example, in 1911, Houston County, Georgia, educated about 3200 blacks and 1050 whites, but funding for Black schools was about $4,500, compared to $10,700 for white schools. During this time, Georgia’s funding of public schools was based on a variety of state and local reactions to different laws and court rulings. Plessy v. Ferguson, for instance, made separate but equal public schools for African American and white students acceptable, but although the school systems were supposed to be equal, in practice, they were separate and unequal. Black teachers still earned considerably less than white teachers. To further the inequality, many superintendents did not adequately supervise local Black schools. This poor supervision is outlined in a quotation by Mr. W. K. Tate, who was the state supervisor of elementary rural schools of South Carolina in 1911. He said: "It has been my observation that the Negro schools of South Carolina are for the most part without supervision of any kind. Frequently the county superintendent does not know where they are located and sometimes the district board cannot tell where the Negro school is taught.".

More about W. E. B. DuBois

W. E. B. Du Bois and the NAACP

W. E. B. Du Bois not only organized the Atlanta Conference of Negro Problems, annually, but also co-founded the National Association for the Advancement of Colored People with Ida Bell Wells-Barnett, Mary White Ovington and others, attempted to realize civil rights for African Americans. Du Bois was a very prominent advocate for blacks' rights, and this organization worked towards eliminating segregation in housing, schooling, the workplace, voting, and transportation. The NAACP also promoted anti-lynching across America.

W. E. B. DuBois vs. Booker T. Washington
William Edward Burghardt Du Bois was a relatively successful man in 19th-century America, considering his race. He was born American, in Great Barrington, Massachusetts, after slavery had been abolished. Du Bois frequently questioned the conditions that black Americans faced on a daily basis. Though he and his colleague, Booker T. Washington, a very influential black leader of the time, eventually hoped to achieve the same result, they had different visions of how they were going to obtain it.

Du Bois was convinced that social change, i.e. the social equality of whites and blacks, could be attained by protest, and agitation. He emphasized the violence with which whites displayed racism towards blacks, in the form of lynching, peonage, disfranchisement, the Jim Crow segregation laws, and race riots. Washington, on the other hand, was optimistic that hard work and perseverance would cause whites to reconsider the former racial norms that they had considered to be true. Du Bois and his supporters felt this position failed to recognize that African Americans were already equal to whites.

Washington attended the Conference at least occasionally, and was well received when he gave the final address at the seventh conference in 1902.

Publications

See also 
 Colored Conventions Movement
 Hampton Negro Conference

Notes

19th-century conferences
20th-century conferences
Conferences in the United States
Academic conferences
Cultural conferences
Political conferences
Clark Atlanta University
African-American history of Georgia (U.S. state)
African-American history between emancipation and the civil rights movement
African-American cultural history
History of African-American civil rights
Cultural heritage of the United States
Defunct organizations based in the United States
1896 establishments in Georgia (U.S. state)
Organizations established in 1896
1914 disestablishments in Georgia (U.S. state)
Organizations disestablished in 1914
Organizations based in Atlanta